Reversible reference system propagation algorithm (r-RESPA) is a time stepping algorithm used in molecular dynamics.

It evolves the system state over time,

where the L is the Liouville operator.

References

Molecular dynamics
Hamiltonian mechanics